Chadwick End is a small village which straddles the border of Warwickshire and the West Midlands Metropolitan Borough of Solihull, situated 3 miles (5 km) southeast of the large village of Knowle and 8 miles northwest of Warwick. It is almost contiguous with the slightly larger village of Baddesley Clinton, which lies a half-mile to the south on the A4141 route.

The name Chadwick means 'farm near a spring', and the village remains a farming community. The south side of the village lies within Warwickshire with the north side lying in the Borough of Solihull. The civil parish was split from part of Balsall on 1 April 2014.

A mile from the village centre lies Chadwick Manor and its Estate, built in 1875 by the architect Edward Holmes (1832-1909). During the 1930s the Manor became a country-house hotel and the estate a racing-stud both owned by Scottish racehorse owner and breeder Captain. Norman (Norrie) Stewart~MacKay (1895-1980), who sold the estate in 1964 (after which the Manor was converted to luxury flats).

The former Poor Clares convent on Rising Lane was founded in 1850; it has been converted into private flats since its closure in 2011.

References

External links

Villages in Warwickshire
Civil parishes in the West Midlands (county)
Solihull